Chamaeleo anchietae, the double-scaled chameleon, is a species of chameleon found in Angola, Democratic Republic of the Congo and Tanzania.

References

Chamaeleo
Reptiles of Angola
Reptiles of the Democratic Republic of the Congo
Reptiles of Tanzania
Reptiles described in 1872
Taxa named by José Vicente Barbosa du Bocage